Sucre is one of the 20 municipalities of the state of Trujillo, Venezuela. The municipality occupies an area of 214 km2 with a population of 30,715 inhabitants according to the 2011 census.

Parishes
The municipality consists of the following four parishes:

El Paraíso
Junín
Sabana de Mendoza
Valmore Rodríguez

References

Municipalities of Trujillo (state)